All For You was the third and last single of Kate Ryan's third album Alive.

Formats and track listings
 CD Single
"All For You" - 3:10
"Je Donnerais Tout" - 3:10
"All For You" (Extended Version) - 5:24

Chart performance

References

2006 singles
Kate Ryan songs
Songs written by Kate Ryan
Songs written by Niklas Bergwall
Songs written by Niclas Kings